The 2009–10 Ford Ranger One Day Cup was the 40th season of official List A domestic cricket in Australia. The season began on 11 October 2009 when Western Australia played Queensland.

Points Table
The top two teams after all rounds are played compete in the Ford Ranger One Day Cup final. The match is contested at the home ground of the side that finishes first. (For an explanation of how points are awarded, see Ford Ranger One Day Cup – Points system).

Teams

Fixture

October

November

December

Mid Season Break

There is a break in the regular schedule of List A games to allow for the 2009–10 KFC Twenty20 Big Bash competition.

January

February

Final

Statistics

Most Runs

Last updated 2 March 2010

Most Wickets

Last updated 3 March 2010

References

Australian domestic limited-overs cricket tournament seasons
Domestic cricket competitions in 2009–10
Ford Ranger One Day Cup season